Theodoros Loukas (Greek: Θεόδωρος Λούκας; born 22 September 1999) is a Greek professional footballer who plays as a midfielder for Trikala.

References 

1999 births
Living people
Association football midfielders
Greek footballers
AEK Athens F.C. players
Apollon Larissa F.C. players
Anagennisi Karditsa F.C. players
Footballers from Trikala